"Do not stand at my grave and weep" is the first line and popular title of the bereavement poem "Immortality", written by Clare Harner in 1934.

Origins
Kansas native Clare Harner (1909–1977) first published "Immortality" in the December 1934 issue of poetry magazine The Gypsy. It was written shortly after the sudden death of her brother. Harner's poem quickly gained traction as a eulogy and was read at funerals in Kansas and Missouri. It was soon reprinted in the Kansas City Times and the Kansas City Bar Bulletin.

Harner earned a degree in journalism at Kansas State University. Several of her other poems were published and anthologized. She married a Marine named David Lyon, and appended his last name to hers. They moved to San Francisco where she continued to work as a journalist for Fairchild Fashion Media.

Plagiarism
The poem is often attributed to anonymous or incorrect sources, such as the Hopi and Navajo tribes. The most notable claimant was Mary Elizabeth Frye (1905–2004), who often handed out xeroxed copies of the poem with her name attached. She was first wrongly cited as the author of the poem in 1983. In her obituary, she asserted that her authorship was "undisputed" and confirmed by Dear Abby. However, Pauline Phillips and her daughter Jeanne Phillips, writing as Abigail van Buren, repeatedly confessed to their readers that they could not confirm who had written the popular poem.

Original version

Below is the version published in The Gypsy of December 1934 (page 16), under the title "Immortality" and followed by the author's name and location: "CLARE HARNER, Topeka, Kan."  The indentation and line breaks are as given there.

Other versions

Other versions of the poem appeared later, usually without attribution, such as the one below. Differing words are shown in it by italics.

The poem is twelve lines long, rhyming in couplets. Each line is in iambic tetrameter, except for lines five and seven, the fifth having an extra syllable, the seventh, two extra.

In popular culture

John Wayne read the poem "from an unspecified source" on December 29, 1977 at the memorial service for film director Howard Hawks. After hearing John Wayne's reading, script writer John Carpenter featured the poem in the 1979 television film Better Late Than Never.  A common reading at funerals and remembrance ceremonies, the poem was introduced to many in the United Kingdom when it was read by the father of a soldier killed by a bomb in Northern Ireland. The soldier's father read the poem on BBC radio in 1995 in remembrance of his son, who had left the poem among his personal effects in an envelope addressed 'To all my loved ones'.

The poem's first four lines are engraved on one of the stones of the Everest Memorial, Chukpi Lhara, in Dhugla Valley, near Everest. Reference to the wind and snow and the general theme of the poem, the absence of the departed, particularly resonate with the loved ones of those who "disappeared" in the mountain range to whom the memorial is dedicated. It is also reproduced on the gravestone of the actor Charles Bronson.

This poem is also used as the lyrics in the song "Still Alive" by D.E.Q.

The first and last couplets are adapted and used as part of the lyrics in the song "Another Time" by Lyriel.

This poem is recited on the episode “Welcome to Kanagawa” of season four of Desperate Housewives.

This poem was adapted as the lyrics in the song "Prayer" by Lizzie West.

The poem was adapted for use in the video game World of Warcraft.

The last four lines of the poem were recited among others in Getting Over It with Bennett Foddy.

The poem is read by Lisa (Kerry Godliman), the dying wife of lead character Tony (played by Ricky Gervais) in the final episode of the Netflix series After Life.

The poem is sung in Season 5 Episode 2 of the NBC TV series Third Watch.

The poem is recited at the funeral of Sir Freddy Butler (played by Joss Ackland) by Lady Annabel Butler (played by Siân Phillips) in the Episode 3 of Season 9 of Midsomer Murders ("Vixen's Run").

The poem is recited on live broadcast at the funeral of Michael Hutchence, the founding member and lead singer of rock band INXS, by his sister Tina Hutchence on 27 November 1997

BBC poll
To coincide with National Poetry Day 1995, the British television programme The Bookworm conducted a poll to discover the nation's favourite poems, and subsequently published the winning poems in book form. The book's preface stated that "Do Not Stand at My Grave and Weep" was "the unexpected poetry success of the year from Bookworm's point of view"; the poem had "provoked an extraordinary response... the requests started coming in almost immediately and over the following weeks the demand rose to a total of some thirty thousand. In some respects it became the nation's favourite poem by proxy... despite it being outside the competition." This was all the more remarkable, since the name and nationality of the American poet did not become known until several years later. In 2004 The Times wrote: "The verse demonstrated a remarkable power to soothe loss. It became popular, crossing national boundaries for use on bereavement cards and at funerals regardless of race, religion or social status".

References

External links
 
 "In Every Lovely Thing"
 
 
 Danish version of the poem
 "내 영혼 바람되어" A tribute of 147 musicians to Victims of Sewol Disaster. YouTube. Published on 6 May 2014.
 German version of the poem following rhyme and meter of the original KOTTMANN: STEHT NICHT AN MEINEM GRAB UND WEINT
Libera (choir):
Do not Stand at my Grave and Weep (video; concert in Leiden-2007); Libera Official, 2011 (YouTube).
Do not Stand at my Grave and Weep (Eternal; music); Libera Official, 2017 (YouTube).

1932 poems
Poems about death